Antonio Ferrigno (22 December 1863, Maiori – 12 December 1940, Salerno) was an Italian painter; best known for his landscapes and genre scenes created during a stay in Brazil.

Biography
Initially self-taught, his first art lessons were taken in the studios of Giacomo Di Chirico. He later was granted a scholarship to attend the Accademia di Belle Arti di Napoli, where he studied with Stanislao Lista and Teofilo Patini, graduating in 1885. This was followed by private studies with Domenico Morelli, during which he felt drawn to landscape painting.

He began exhibiting in 1882, and soon attracted many notable customers, including the Filangieri family, the Banco di Napoli and, in 1890, King Umberto I, who purchased his painting "March Sun" for the Museo di Capodimonte.

In 1893, he moved to Brazil, where he joined his friend Rosalbino Santoro in São Paulo. He remained there for twelve years and became known as the "painter of coffee", because he specialized in painting landscapes of the plantations, commissioned by wealthy hacendados. A major exhibition of his work was held in Paris in 1900, in conjunction with campaigns to promote the drinking of coffee.

In addition to the promotional aspects, his paintings have documentary value, as they portray the period immediately following the Lei Áurea (abolition of slavery) in 1888. During this time, much of the manual labor on the plantations was performed by Italian immigrants (especially Venetians). Some of his paintings involving them were commissioned by the Italian government. His works cover every stage in the coffee production process.

From 1900 to 1904, he spent much of his time inland, with extended stays at plantations in Victória and Santa Gertrudes. The latter was considered to be a "model settlement" as it was equipped with electricity and a telephone. A major showing of his coffee-related paintings was a great success at the Louisiana Purchase Exposition of 1904.

He held his final exhibition in Brazil in 1905, and returned to Italy, where he settled in Salerno and became a drawing teacher at the technical school in 1913. Two years later, he auctioned off many of his works to benefit the victims of an earthquake in Abruzzo. His paintings continued to display the natural colors that his palette had acquired in Brazil. These are especially prominent in a series of paintings depicting the Villa Rufolo that he created in the 1920s. Together with Gaetano Capone, Luigi Paolillo and Pietro Scoppetta, he was part of what became known as the "Scuola di Maiori" or, simply, the "Costaioli". His last notable exhibition was for the "Sindacato provinciale fascista di belle arti", which took place in Positano in 1937.

A major retrospective of his work was held in 2005 at the Pinacoteca do Estado de São Paulo, on the centenary of his departure.

Selected paintings

References

Further reading
 Ruth Sprung Tarasantchi, Antonio Ferrigno: 100 anos depois (exhibition catalog), Pinacoteca, 2005
 Massimo Bignardi and Ada Patrizia Fiorillo, I pittori di Maiori. Artisti della Costa d'Amalfi tra XIX e XX secolo,  Centro di Cultura Amalfitana, 2005

External links 

 Antonio Ferrigno from Pintores Paisagistas. São Paulo 1890-1920, by Ruth Sprung Tarasantchi. EdUSP 2002, Pgs.135-141 
 Arcadja Auctions: More works by Ferrigno (mostly non-Brazilian)

1863 births
1940 deaths
19th-century Italian painters
Italian male painters
20th-century Italian painters
Landscape painters
Italian emigrants to Brazil
People from the Province of Salerno
Accademia di Belle Arti di Napoli alumni
Coffee production
History of São Paulo (state)
19th-century Italian male artists
20th-century Italian male artists
Maiori